The UAF Regions' Cup is a national cup competition in Ukraine for amateur teams of all regions. Before 2021, it was known as the FFU Regions' Cup. The competition was first played in the 2015 season and the winner receives the right to progress to the UEFA Regions' Cup which serves as similar continental competition.

Before 2015 to the UEFA Regions' Cup were qualifying better Ukrainian amateur clubs of the Ukrainian Football Amateur Association and usually that had won the Ukrainian Amateur Football Championship. In 2015 the Football Federation of Ukraine organized a specific tournament for regions' representative football teams. The new tournament is not part of the national football amateur association (AAFU).

Finals

Performance by team

UEFA Regions' Cup

Previous teams

 1999 – Ukrainian national amateur team, Kyiv
 2001 – Dnister Ovidiopol (1999 Champion)
 2003 – Pivdenstal Yenakiive (2001 Cup holder)
 2005 – KZEZO Kakhovka (2004 Champion), known as Kakhovka-Kzeso (the Russian-like spelling of Kzeso)
 2007 – Ivan Odesa (2005 Champion)
 2009 – Bastion Illichivsk (2007 Champion), was in fact Bastion-2 Illichivsk as the first team was playing at professional level
 2011 – Yednist-2 Plysky (2009 Champion), the first team FC Yednist Plysky at that time played at professional level
 2013 – Nove Zhyttia - Putrivka (2011 Champion), a united team of both finalists that represent two different regions
 2015 – AF-Pyatykhatska Volodymyrivka (2014 Cup holder)

FFU Regions' Cup winners
 2017 – Kirovohrad Oblast (Inhulets)
 2019 – Lviv Oblast
 2021 – scratched
 2023 – Ivano-Frankivsk Oblast

Regions in Europe

* – shared representation

See also 
 Ukrainian football championship among amateurs

External links 
  Ukrainian Football Federation

References

 
Regions
Football in the regions of Ukraine
UEFA Regions' Cup
Recurring sporting events established in 2015
2015 establishments in Ukraine
Amateur association football
Ukrainian Association of Football
Amateur sport in Ukraine